Good360 is a 501(c)(3) charitable organization located in Alexandria, Virginia. The organization's mission is to transform lives by finding hope and possibilities for individuals, families, and communities who have been impacted by disaster or other challenging life circumstances. In 2020, it was ranked the 50th largest charity in the United States by Forbes magazine.

Good360 has distributed more than $10 billion in donated goods around the world, helping its network of more than 90,000 prequalified nonprofits strengthen communities and improve the lives of millions. As a result of the COVID-19 pandemic, Good360 helped distribute over $175 million in donations to its network of nonprofits to help impacted communities across the country.

Organization
The organization, founded in 1983, was originally known as Gifts In Kind International. In 2011 the organization became known as Good360.

Carly Fiorina served as the organization's chair from 2012 until 2015.

References

External links
 
 Good360 on Charity Navigator

Charities based in Virginia
Non-profit organizations based in Alexandria, Virginia
Organizations established in 1983